The Hastings and Prince Edward District School Board (known as English-language Public District School Board No. 29 prior to 1999) has 39 elementary and eight secondary schools, serving over 18,400 students, and employing more than 1,070 teachers and 705 support staff. The school board covers a wide geographical area of 7,221 square kilometres bordered by Maynooth to the north, Deseronto to the east, Prince Edward County to the south and Quinte West to the west.

The eight secondary schools managed by the Board are:
Bayside Secondary School in Bayside
Centennial Secondary School in Belleville
Centre Hastings Secondary School in Madoc
Eastside Secondary School in Belleville
North Hastings High School in Bancroft
Prince Edward Collegiate Institute in Picton
Quinte Secondary School- Closed  in Belleville
Trenton High School in Trenton

Previously the Hastings County Board of Education and the Prince Edward County Board of Education served their respective areas.

See also

List of school districts in Ontario
List of high schools in Ontario

References

External links
 Hastings & Prince Edward District School Board

School districts in Ontario
Education in Belleville, Ontario